Richardus Anglicus (14th century) was an English author of alchemical texts.

Works 
Richardus Anglicus the alchemist wrote several texts in the 14th century, including Correctorium alchemiae, also known as Corrector (fatuorum). He was considered among the leading English alchemists of the period. Texts attributed to him were printed in De Alchemia (1541, 1550) and in Theatrum Chemicum (1602–1661). He was well read in the alchemical literature through the 14th century and stands in that tradition, including concerns with the materia prima.

Identity 
The name Richardus Anglicus was, however, ambiguous. Historians of science have identified him variously with Richard of Wendover (by John Ferguson), with Robert of York (died ) (by Lynn Thorndike), and with Richard of Middleton (by Hermann Kopp). More recently, Joachim Telle disproved these attributions. José Rodriguez Guerrero attributes the Correctorium alchemiae to Bernard of Trier (not to be confused with the fictional Italian alchemist Bernard Trevisan), whom he identifies with Eberhard von der Marck-Aremberg (1305–1387), a law graduate and clergyman, who became chorbishop of Cologne before leaving the church to marry. He further argues that Bernard of Trier is also the author of the later version of the text entitled Corrector (fatuorum).

References

Bibliography 
 Joachim Telle: Ricardus Anglicus. In: Verfasserlexikon. 2. Auflage. Vol. 8, 1992, pp. 38–41.

14th-century English writers